Orzo (from , from Latin ), also known as risoni ('large [grains of] rice'), is a form of short-cut pasta, shaped like a large grain of rice. Orzo is traditionally made from flour, but it can also be made of whole grain.  It is often made with semolina, a type of flour made from durum wheat.  

The name orzo is common for this pasta shape in North America, but less so in Italy, where the word means barley.

Uses
There are many different ways to serve orzo. Orzo can be served alone; in soup, especially for children; as part of a salad, a pilaf, or giouvetsi; or baked in a casserole. Orzo can be colored by saffron, chilies, and black beans to yield yellow, orange, or black pasta.

Similar products
In Spain, the equivalent pasta is called . Confusion may arise from the fact that  is also the Spanish word for pine nuts. Ptitim is a rice-grain-shaped pasta developed in the 1950s in Israel as a substitute for rice.

Preparation
Orzo is often boiled in Italian soups, like minestrone. It can also be boiled and lightly fried, to create a dish similar to risotto.

See also
 
 
 
 List of pasta
 Wedding Soup
Ptitim

References

Types of pasta
Greek cuisine
Turkish cuisine
Middle Eastern cuisine